Talicada nyseus, the red Pierrot, is a small but striking butterfly found in the Indian subcontinent and South-East Asia belonging to the lycaenids, or blues family. The red Pierrots, often found perching on its larva host plant, Kalanchoe, are usually noticed due to their striking patterns and colors.

Description

The butterfly has a wingspan of 3 to 3.5 cm. The upperside of its wings are black except for a large orange portion of the lower edge of the hindwing.

On the underside, the forewing is white with black spots more toward the margin. The hindwing is very striking, it is white with black spots toward the base and the margin has a wide band of orange with white spots. There is a lot of variation found in the blacks spots on the hindwings.

Technical description

Range
Himalayan foothills, North India, South India, Meghalaya, Assam, Sri Lanka and North Myanmar.

Status
They are widely distributed in peninsular India, and have been recorded from many localities in Maharashtra, Karnataka, Punjab, and Odisha. They are also found in the hilly regions of northeastern India and northern Myanmar. Studies suggest that they may be on the way to colonizing the foothills of the Himalayas due to changes in the habitat.

Habitat
They are found in semi-arid plains, degraded patches of evergreen patches, and semi-evergreen forest, gardens, hill stations and forests—in fact, wherever its food plant, Kalanchoe, is abundant. It is found from the plains up to 8,000 feet.

Habits

The red Pierrot is a weak flier, and flutters about close to the ground. It flies in short bursts and settles often but not for very long. It basks with its wings half open, but prefers shade to sun, and jungle or undergrowth to open areas. It keeps on the wing almost till dark when it settles on the undersides of leaves and twigs often in company. It is sluggish early in the morning and late in the evening.
It visits flowers of herbs, especially of the families Amaranthaceae and Acanthaceae, for nectar. It visits both ornamental and wild flowers and varieties of Alternanthera are among its favourites.

It always sits with its wings closed to display the bright markings of its undersides. It fearlessness, weak flight and distinctive markings all indicate that it is a protected butterfly, which is peculiar considering that its host plants are not known to contain any sequestrable toxins.

There is a mention in literature of the species being found at lights at night, however such phenomena are usually restricted to species that are crepuscular and this occurrence may be incidental.

Life history
It is not a common butterfly, but near its food plant, Kalanchoe, it is found in abundance and is gregarious in all its stages.

Egg
The female lays eggs on the underside of a leaf. They are light green ellipsoid-shaped small egg. Young and old leaves are selected without discrimination as the leaves of Kalanchoe are thick and succulent during all stages.

Caterpillar
The caterpillar is pale yellow to a dirty white, and flattened with large, jet black spiracles. The entire body is covered with tiny white setae or bristle-like hair.

This caterpillar is a leaf miner by habit and this serves as its defense. As soon as it hatches it bores into the leaf and will spend the rest of its life between the epidermal layers of the leaf. Occasionally it will change leaves.

The caterpillar tunnels through the entire leaf in a neat winding manner so as to make sure to consume the entire leaf. It leaves a black trail within that is filled with droppings. The caterpillar can only be seen when it is changing leaves or when it comes to the surface to pupate.

Pupa
At the time of pupation the caterpillar comes out of the leaf and weaves a silk pad and a tight body band and then moults to form the pupa. The pupa can be either on the under or upper surface of the leaf. It is yellow and covered with long light hairs. The pupa is also marked with numerous black spots all over the body.

Food plants
The larval host plants are Kalanchoe laciniata and K. pinnata of the family Crassulaceae (stonecrop family); the latter host being a common garden plant. Adult butterflies have sometimes been seen to visit lichens. Studies suggest that they collect phenolic substances by scraping lichens.

See also
List of butterflies of India (Lycaenidae)
List of butterflies of the Western Ghats

References

External links

 
 HOSTS database, NHM, UK
 ASEAN biodiversity database

Polyommatini
Butterflies of Asia
Butterflies described in 1843